Napometa is a genus of Atlantic dwarf spiders that was first described by P. L. G. Benoit in 1977.

Species
 it contains two species:
Napometa sanctaehelenae Benoit, 1977 (type) – St. Helena
Napometa trifididens (O. Pickard-Cambridge, 1873) – St. Helena

See also
 List of Linyphiidae species (I–P)

References

Araneomorphae genera
Linyphiidae
Spiders of Africa